Ifẹ̀ (also Ilé-Ifẹ̀) is an ancient Yoruba city in south-western Nigeria. The city is located in present-day Osun State. Ife is about 218 kilometers northeast of Lagos with a population of over 500,000 people, which is the highest in Osun State according to population census of 2006.

According to the traditions of the Yoruba religion, Ilé Ifè was founded by the order of the Supreme God Olodumare by Obatala. It then fell into the hands of his brother Oduduwa, which created enmity between the two. Oduduwa created a dynasty there, and sons and daughters of this dynasty became rulers of many other kingdoms in Yorubaland. The first Oòni of Ife is a descendant of Oduduwa, which was the 401st Orisha. The present ruler since 2015 is Oba Adeyeye Enitan Ogunwusi Ojaja II, Ooni of Ife who is also a Nigerian accountant. Named as the city of 401 deities, Ife is home to many worshippers of these deities and is where they are routinely celebrated through festivals.

Ilé-Ifè is famous worldwide for its ancient and naturalistic bronze, stone and terracotta sculptures, dating back to between 1200 and 1400 CE.

History

Origin of Ife: Creation of the world

According to Yoruba religion, Olodumare, the Supreme God, ordered Obatala to create the earth, but on his way he found palm wine which he drank and became intoxicated. Therefore, the younger brother of the latter, Oduduwa, took the three items of creation from him, climbed down from the heavens on a chain and threw a handful of earth on the primordial ocean, then put a cockerel on it so that it would scatter the earth, thus creating the land on which Ile Ife would be built. Oduduwa planted a palm nut in a hole in the newly formed land and from there sprang a great tree with sixteen branches, a symbolic representation of the clans of the early Ife city-state. The usurpation of creation, by Oduduwa, gave rise to the ever-lasting conflict between him and his elder brother Obatala, which is still re-enacted in the modern era by the cult groups of the two clans during the Itapa New Year festival. On account of his creation of the world, Oduduwa became the ancestor of the first divine king of the Yoruba, while Obatala is believed to have created the first Yoruba people out of clay. The meaning of the word "ife" in Yoruba is "expansion"; "Ile-Ife" is therefore in reference to the myth of origin as "The Land of Expansion" (the word, Ile, as pronounced in modern Yoruba language, means house or home, which could make the name of the town mean "The House of Expansion").

Origin of the regional states: Dispersal from the holy city
Oduduwa had sons, daughters, and a grandson, who went on to found their own kingdoms and empires, namely Ila Orangun, Owu, Ketu, Sabe, Egba, Popo and Oyo. Oranmiyan, Oduduwa's last born, was one of his father's principal ministers and overseer of the nascent Edo empire after Oduduwa granted the plea of the Edo people for his governance. When Oranmiyan decided to go back to Ile Ife, after a period of service and exile in Benin, he left behind a child named Eweka that he had in the interim with an indigenous princess of Benin. The young boy went on to become the first legitimate ruler and Oba of the second Edo dynasty that has ruled what is now Benin from that day to this. Oranmiyan later went on to found the Oyo empire that stretched at its height from the western banks of the river Niger to the Eastern banks of the river Volta. It would serve as one of the most powerful of Africa's medieval states, prior to its collapse in the 19th century.

Traditional setting

The King (Ooni of Ile-Ife)

The Oòni (or king) of Ife is a descendant of the godking Oduduwa, and is counted first among the Yoruba kings. He is traditionally considered the 401st spirit (Orisha), the only one that speaks. In fact, the royal dynasty of Ife traces its origin back to the founding of the city more than ten thousand years before the birth of Jesus Christ. The present ruler is Oba Enitan Adeyeye Ogunwusi (Ojaja II). The Ooni ascended his throne in 2015. Following the formation of the Yoruba Orisha Congress in 1986, the Ooni acquired an international status the likes of which the holders of his title hadn't had since the city's colonisation by the British. Nationally he had always been prominent amongst the Federal Republic of Nigeria's company of royal Obas, being regarded as the chief priest and custodian of the holy city of all the Yorubas. In former times, the palace of the Ooni of Ife was a structure built of authentic enameled bricks, decorated with artistic porcelain tiles and all sorts of ornaments. At present, it is a more modern series of buildings. The current Ooni, Oba Adeyeye Enitan Ogunwusi Ojaja II, Ooni of Ife, (born October 17, 1974) is a Nigerian accountant and the 51st Ooni of Ife. He succeeded the late Oba Okunade Sijuwade(Olubuse II) who was the 50th ooni of Ife, and who had died on July 28, 2015.

Cults for the spirits
Ife is well known as the city of 401 deities (also known as irumole or orishas). It is said that every day of the year the traditional worshippers celebrate a festival of one of these deities. Often the festivals extend over more than one day and they involve both priestly activities in the palace and theatrical dramatisations in the rest of the kingdom. Historically the King only appeared in public during the annual Olojo festival (celebration of the new dawn); other important festivals here include the Itapa festival for Obatala and Obameri, the Edi festival for Moremi Ajasoro, and the Igare masqueraders.

Art history
Kings and gods were often depicted with large heads because the artists believed that the Ase was held in the head, the Ase being the inner power and energy of a person. Both historic figures of Ife and the offices associated with them are represented. One of the best documented among this is the early king Obalufon II who is said to have invented bronze casting and is honored in the form of a naturalistic copper life-size mask.

The city was a settlement of substantial size between the 12th and 14th centuries, with houses featuring potsherd pavements. Ilé-Ifè is known worldwide for its ancient and naturalistic bronze, stone and terracotta sculptures, which reached their peak of artistic expression between 1200 and 1400 CE In the period around 1300 CE the artists at Ife developed a refined and naturalistic sculptural tradition in terracotta, stone and copper alloy—copper, brass, and bronze—many of which appear to have been created under the patronage of King Obalufon II, the man who today is identified as the Yoruba patron deity of brass casting, weaving and regalia. After this period, production declined as political and economic power shifted to the nearby kingdom of Benin which, like the Yoruba kingdom of Oyo, developed into a major empire.

Bronze and terracotta art created by this civilization are significant examples of naturalism in pre-colonial African art and are distinguished by their variations in regalia, facial marking patterns, and body proportions. Ancient Ife also was famous for its glass beads which have been found at sites as far away as Mali, Mauritania, and Ghana.

Shrines, altars, and temples 
Igbo Olokun: Igbo Olokun used to be a forested, sacred grove (igbo) that housed shrines at which the goddess Olokun was worshipped. Igbo Olokun in the city of Ile-Ife, in south-western Nigeria, was said to have a history of glass makers with unique manufacturing techniques in West Africa. The recovery of glass beads and associated production materials were found there during excavation. Analysis of the composition of the artefacts and preliminary dating of the site, which puts the main timing of glass-working between the 11th and 15th centuries AD. The results of these studies suggest that glass bead manufacture at this site was largely independent of glass-making traditions documented farther afield, and that Igbo Olokun may represent one of the earliest known glass-production workshops in West Africa. The location is not divulged except on request and permission of the keepers of the shrine because it is a sacred grove.

Oduduwa Shrine and Grove: The shrine of the progenitor of the Yoruba race. Worshippers and initiates flood the place seeking blessings and pay obeisance to the originator of their civilization.

Agbonniregun Temple: The grove of Ọrunmila an Orisha. He is the Orisha of wisdom, knowledge, and divination. This source of knowledge is believed to have a keen understanding of the human form and of purity, and is therefore praised as often being more effective than other remedies.

Archaeology
 
Burnt pipes (or tuyere), stone tools, broken calabash, decorated potsherds, and pottery (e.g., rimsherd, plane-sherd body, broken, and washed pottery) were excavated at Iyekere. Iron smelting, charcoal utilized in the process of smelting, and iron slags involved in pitting were also discovered.

Iron smelting occurred in the Ife region. The yield and efficiency were quite high as the iron smelting process yielded ore grade near 80 percent iron oxide, lean slag possessed less than 60 percent iron oxide, and no greater than the required amount of iron oxide in the slag was left for slag formation. While more excavation is needed to produce a more accurate estimate for the age of the smelting site, it can be approximated to likely being precolonial, during the Late Iron Age.

Igbo Olokun, also known as Olokun Grove, may be one of the earliest workshops for producing glass in West Africa. Glass production may have begun during, if not before, the 11th century. The 11th - 15th century were the peak of glass production. High lime, high alumina (HLHA) and low lime, high alumina (LLHA) glass are distinct compositions that were developed using locally sourced recipes, raw materials, and pyrotechnology. The presence of HLHA glass beads discovered throughout West Africa (e.g., Igbo-Ukwu in southern Nigeria, Gao and Essouk in Mali, and Kissi in Burkina Faso), after the ninth century CE, reveals the broader importance of this glass industry in the region and shows its participation in regional trade networks (e.g., trans-Saharan trade, trans-Atlantic trade). Glass beads served as “the currency for negotiating political power, economic relations, and cultural/spiritual values” for “Yoruba, West Africans, and the African diaspora.”

In Osun Grove, the distinct glassmaking technology produced by the Yoruba persisted into the seventeenth century.

Government
The main city of Ife is divided into two local government areas: Ife East, headquartered at Oke-ogbo and Ife central at Ajebandele area of the city. Both local governments are composed of a total of 21 political wards. The city has an estimated population of 355,813 people.

Geography
Latitudes 7°28′N and 7°45′N and longitudes 4°30′E and 4°34′E. Ile-Ife is a rural area with settlements where agriculture is occupied by most. Ife has an undulating terrain underlain by metamorphic rocks and characterized by two types of soils, deep clay soils on the upper slopes and sandy soils on the lower parts. Within the tropical savanna climate zone of West Africa. It has average rainfall of  usually from March to October and a mean relative humidity of 75% to 100%. Ife is east of the city of Ibadan and connected to it through the Ife-Ibadan highway; Ife is also  from Osogbo and has road networks to other cities such as Ede, Ondo and Ilesha. There is the Opa river and reservoir, that serves as a water treatment facility for OAU college.

Economy
Ife contains universities that are very well known in Nigeria and internationally such as Obafemi Awolowo University formerly University of Ife and Oduduwa University. It also contains attractions like the Natural History Museum of Nigeria.  Ife is home to a regional agricultural center with an area that produces vegetables, grain cocoa, tobacco, and cotton. Ife has a few open markets, such as Oja Titun or Odo-gbe market with about 1,500 shops.

In terms of development, the Ife central area of Ilé Ifè is more developed. The areas include Parakin, Eleyele, Modomo, Damico, and Crown Estate Area. These areas are characterized by modern houses, good road network, constant electricity and security.

Education
 
 
Seventh Day Adventist Grammar School, Ile-Ife

Notable people
Tunde Odunlade (born 1954), artist and musician
Adeyeye Enitan Ogunwusi; (Ọjájá II) (born 1974), 51st Ooni of Ife
Femi Fani-Kayode (born 1960), Nigerian politician, essayist, poet and lawyer
Iyiola Omisore (born 1957), Nigerian businessman, engineer and politician
Chief Remi Adetokunboh Fani-Kayode, Q.C., SAN, CON 
Alayeluwa Oba Okunade Sijuwade Olubuse II (1930–2015), 50th Ooni of Ife

See also

 Ife Empire
 History of the Yoruba people
 Legends of Africa
 List of rulers of Ife

Notes

References 

 Akinjogbin, I. A. (Hg.): The Cradle of a Race: Ife from the Beginning to 1980, Lagos 1992. The book also has chapters on the present religious situation in the town.
 Bascom, William: The Yoruba of south-western Nigeria, New York 1969. The book mainly deals with Ife.
 Bascom, William "The Olojo festival at Ife, 1937", in: A. Falassi (ed.), Time out of Time: Essays on the Festival, Albuquerque, 1987, 62–73.
 Blier, Suzanne Preston. Art and Risk in Ancient Yoruba: Ife History, Power, and Identity c.1300, Cambridge University Press 2015. .
 Blier, Suzanne Preston. http://scholar.harvard.edu/files/blier/files/blier.pdf "Art in Ancient Ife Birthplace of the Yoruba"]. African Arts 2012
 Frobenius, Leo, The Voice of Africa, London 1913 (Frobenius stayed for nearly two months in Ife, in 1910-11).
 Johnson, Samuel: History of the Yorubas, London 1921.
 Lange, Dierk: "The dying and the rising God in the New Year Festival of Ife", in: Lange, Ancient Kingdoms of West Africa, Dettelbach 2004, pp. 343–376.
 Lange, Dierk: "Preservation of Canaanite creation culture in Ife", in: H.-P. Hahn and G. Spittler (eds.), Between Resistance and Expansion, Münster 2004, 125–158.
 Lange, Dierk: "Origin of the Yoruba and 'Lost Tribes of Israel'", Anthropos, 106, 2011, 579–595.
 Olubunmi, A. O. The Rise and Fall of the Yoruba Race 10,000 BC–1960 AD, The 199 Publishing Palace 
 Olubunmi, A. O. On Ijesa Racial Purity, The 199 Publishing Palace 
 Ogunyemi, Yemi D. (Yemi D. Prince), The Oral Traditions in Ile-Ife, Academica Press, 2009, Palo Alto, USA.
 Ogunyemi, Yemi D. (Yemi D. Prince): The Aura of Yoruba Philosophy, Religion and Literature, Diaspora Press of America, 2003, Boston, USA.
 Ogunyemi, Yemi D. (Yemi D. Prince): Introduction to Yoruba Philosophy, Religion and Literature, Athelia Henrietta Press, 1998, New York, USA.
 Ogunyemi, Yemi D. (Yemi D. Prince): The Covenant of the Earth--Yoruba Religious & Philosophical Narratives, Athelia Henrietta Press, 1998, New York, USA.
 Olupona, Jacob K.: City of 201 Gods: Ile-Ife in Time, Space and Imagination, Berkeley 2011.
 Stride, G. T. and C. Ifeka: "Peoples and Empires of West Africa: West Africa in History 1000–1800", New York 1971.
 Walsh, M. J., "The Edi festival at Ile Ife", African Affairs, 47 (1948), 231–8.
 Willett, Frank: Ife in the History of West African Sculpture, London, 1967. The book also deals with some oral traditions of Ile-Ife.
 Wyndham, John: "The creation", Man, 19 (1919), 107–8.

External links 
 Ife - World History Encyclopedia
 Homepage of the Ooni of Ife 
 The Story of Africa: Ife and Benin BBC page on Ife
 Yoruba Myths Por Ulli Beie

 
Archaeological sites in Nigeria
Cities in Nigeria
Cities in Yorubaland
Holy cities
Populated places in Osun State
Sacred sites in traditional African religions
Yoruba history
Yoruba religion
Archaeological sites of Western Africa
Articles containing video clips